Iowa State Cyclones baseball was the intercollegiate baseball program at Iowa State University in Ames, Iowa. The program existed from 1892 to 2001. Due to budget cuts, Iowa State athletic director Bruce Van De Velde announced the end of the baseball program on April 2, 2001.   

Iowa State's last game was a 17–4 loss to Oklahoma State in the Big 12 Tournament on May 18, 2001.

Club baseball

Since the fall of 2001, baseball at Iowa State has been played as a club sport in the National Club Baseball Association.

Yearly record

Final poll rankings
This is a table of Iowa State's ranking in the Collegiate Baseball Division I Final Polls.

NCAA Championship History

First Team All-Americans 
This is a list of Iowa State American Baseball Coaches Association All-Americans.

 1975
Randy Duarte (2B)
 1991
Tom Vantiger (OF)

Head coaching history

References

 
1892 establishments in Iowa
2002 disestablishments in Iowa